Gordon Lynn Hudson (June 22, 1962 — September 27, 2021) was an American professional football player who was a tight end in the United States Football League (USFL) and National Football League (NFL) for three seasons during the 1980s.  Hudson played college football for Brigham Young University, was a two-time consensus All-American, and set the NCAA record for most career receiving yards by a tight end (2,484).  He was elected to the College Football Hall of Fame in 2009.

Early years 
Hudson was born in Everett, Washington.  He attended Brighton High School in Salt Lake City, Utah.  He lettered twice in three different sports, football, basketball and baseball. He was an all-conference tight end in football while also earning all-conference honors in basketball.

Brigham Young University 
The highly recruited Hudson suited up for some varsity games while playing mostly with the jayvee. As a sophomore, he earned the starting tight end role and was selected by coaches as the most valuable rookie. He received All-WAC Second-team honors as well as Associated Press All-America honorable mention honors  He was second in the WAC in receiving  and fifth in the NCAA with 5.6 receptions per game while averaging 14.3 yards per catch. He totaled 67 catches for 960 yards and 10 touchdowns.

His top outing of the year was a 13 catches for 259 yards and three touchdowns vs. Utah (the 259-yard outing set an NCAA record for most yards by a tight end in a single game)  and he was named WAC player of the week for the effort. He also tied the NCAA record of 67 receptions in a season by a tight end. He made seven grabs for 126 yards and one touchdown vs. Washington State in the Holiday Bowl. 

As a junior, in 1982, he was Consensus All-America pick. He was the only unanimous All-WAC selection, Again had 67 catches for 928 yards and six touchdowns, averaging 13.9 yards per catch and 6.1 catches per game. He reportedly made some spectacular one-handed grabs among his seven receptions for 81 yards against Ohio State in the Holiday Bowl. 

In 1983, as a senior, Hudson earned consensus All-America honors again  along with quarterback Steve Young, giving BYU two consensus All-Americans in the same season for the first in BYU history. He was All-WAC First-team for the second time and totaled 44 catches for 596 yards and six touchdowns in eight games before having his season shortened by an injury. He averaged 13.5 yards per catch and 5.5 catches per game. Hudson finished career as the NCAA record holder for most career receiving yards by a tight end with 2,484.

USFL 
Hudson played for the Los Angeles Express of the United States Football League in 1984 and 1985, where he received All-USFL honors during the league's last season in 1985.

Seattle Seahawks 
Drafted by the Seattle Seahawks in the first round (22nd overall) of the 1984 NFL Supplemental Draft of USFL and CFL Players.  He played sixteen games and ended with 13 receptions and one touchdown in 1986, which was his only NFL season.

Life after football
Hudson worked as a real estate officer in Murray, Utah. He died from natural causes on September 27, 2021, in San Jose, California. He was 59.

References 

1962 births
2021 deaths
All-American college football players
American football tight ends
BYU Cougars football players
College Football Hall of Fame inductees
Los Angeles Express players
Sportspeople from Everett, Washington
Players of American football from Washington (state)
Seattle Seahawks players